MZQ, MzQ or mzq may refer to:

MzQ Digital, a company co-founded by Adithya Srinivasan
Majgaon railway station, Majgaon, Assam, India (station code: MZQ)
Mori Atas language, an Austronesian language spoken in Sulawesi, Indonesia (ISO-639-3: mzq)
Mkuze Airport, Mkuze, South Africa (IATA: MZQ)